Sam Nixon is an English singer and television presenter. He came third on the Pop Idol television series in 2003 and is now one half of the duo Sam & Mark, with the other being Mark Rhodes.

Early life
He was originally a catering student from Barnsley College in South Yorkshire. He attended Holgate School, Barnsley from 1997 to 2002 and is still living in Barnsley.

Career

Television
Nixon's first television appearance was on popular children's game show Fun House presented by Pat Sharp. Nixon and fellow contestant Rosie Feast didn't manage to answer the final question to win the grand prize.

Nixon began a television presenting career, co-hosting Top of the Pops Reloaded. He then formed a presentational double-act on the BAFTA winning CBBC show Level Up, with Mark Rhodes, from 3 April 2006 until 1 September 2006. He worked on the children's Saturday morning show, TMi, on BBC Two, which started on 17 September 2006. The series finished on 7 February 2007. Sam returned to television at the beginning of the Easter holidays 2007 in a show called Do Something Different which he presents with Rhodes and Ayesha Asantewaa to attempt to get 1 million children to "try something new". Sam (along with Mark Rhodes) is the presenter of TMi Friday on the CBBC Channel.
Sam and Mark are now hosting Sam & Mark's Big Friday Wind-Up, which features mainly trivia, as well as playing a prank on families.

Sam and Mark took part in two episodes of Hole in the Wall airing on 11 October 2008 and 14 November 2009 and were contestants on a celebrity version of TV show Total Wipeout which aired on 2 January 2010.

In 2012, Nixon took part in the seventh series of Dancing on Ice. He was voted out of the show on 26 February 2012. In 2015, he participated in Celebrity MasterChef on BBC One.

Music
Sam & Mark had a No. 1 UK chart hit with their cover of The Beatles tune "With a Little Help from My Friends". Their second single "The Sun Has Come Your Way" debuted in the UK top 40 at No. 19, but they were dropped from their record deal after this release.

Nixon also performs in a band called Mason. Mason performed their first gig on 2 June 2007 at the "Burn down the Disco" night at The Arches in Barnsley, supported by local band MUNICH, and also headlined a local mini music festival at Darton, Barnsley a month later. They continue to perform local gigs as and when Sam's TV schedule allows.

Radio

Sam & Mark present a Sunday show on Midlands based radio station Free Radio.

Theatre
In 2019, Nixon appeared as Jack in Theatre Royal Wakefield’s version of Jack and the Beanstalk.

In 2021, Nixon returned to perform at the Theatre Royal Wakefield in their version of Beauty and the Beast.

Filmography
Television

Pop Idol performances
Top 50: "Walking in Memphis" by (Marc Cohn)
Wildcards: "Over My Shoulder" (Mike + The Mechanics)
Top 12: "Handbags & Gladrags" (Rod Stewart)
Top 10: "True Colours" (Cyndi Lauper)
Top 8: "I Want Love" (Elton John)
Top 7: "Blame It on the Boogie" (Jackson 5)
Top 6: "With A Little Help From My Friends" (The Beatles)
Top 5: "Mr. Bojangles" (Sammy Davis Jr.)
Top 4: "Santa Claus Is Coming To Town" (Bruce Springsteen)
Top 4: "I Wish It Could Be Christmas Everyday" (Wizzard)
Top 3: "Always" (Bon Jovi)
Top 3: "Maggie May" (Rod Stewart)

Discography
Singles
 "With a Little Help from My Friends" – Sam & Mark (March 2004)
 "The Sun Has Come Your Way" – Sam & Mark (May 2004)

References

1986 births
Living people
21st-century British singers
Musicians from Barnsley
Pop Idol contestants
Top of the Pops presenters